Folk song or Folksong or Folksongs refers to a song in the traditional or contemporary folk music genre.

Folk Songs may also refer to:
Folk Songs (Berio), a 1964 song cycle by Luciano Berio
Folk Songs, a composition by Eric Mandat
Folksongs (Alfred Deller album), 1972
Folksongs, a 2000 album by Anne Sofie von Otter
Folk Songs, and album by Wilfred Brown and John Williams, 1998
Folk Songs (Charlie Haden album), 1979
Folk Songs (Kronos Quartet album), with guest vocalists Sam Amidon, Olivia Chaney, Rhiannon Giddens, and Natalie Merchant, 2017
Folk Songs (James Yorkston album), 2009